Triphammer Falls is a  waterfall on Fall Creek in Ithaca, New York, located within the campus of Cornell University. The waterfall existed naturally but was altered substantially in order to construct a dam in the 19th century, leading to the formation of Beebe Lake. In 1997, a pedestrian bridge was built over Triphammer Falls to connect Central and North Campus.

References 

Cornell University
Waterfalls of New York (state)